This is a list of the German Media Control Top100 Singles Chart number-ones of 1975.

See also
List of number-one hits (Germany)

References
 German Singles Chart archives from 1956
 Media Control Chart archives from 1960

1975 in West Germany
1975 record charts
1975